Shahrak-e Shahid Mohasan Boni Najar (also Romanized as Shahrak-e Shahīd Moḥasan Bonī Najār) is a village in Kiyaras Rural District, in the Central District of Gotvand County, Khuzestan Province, Iran. At the 2006 census, its population was 114, in 21 families.

References 

Populated places in Gotvand County